Calobota linearifolia is a species of flowering plant in the family Fabaceae.

References

Crotalarieae
Flora of Namibia
Least concern plants
Taxonomy articles created by Polbot
Taxobox binomials not recognized by IUCN